Alexandrovka is a rural locality (a selo) and the administrative center of Alexandrovskoye Rural Settlement, Bykovsky District, Volgograd Oblast, Russia. The population was 562 as of 2010. There are 7 streets.

Geography 
Alexandrovka is located in steppe, 21 km east of Bykovo (the district's administrative centre) by road. Krasnye Zori is the nearest rural locality.

References 

Rural localities in Bykovsky District